A Nation is Built is a 1938 Australian documentary directed by Frank Hurley.

References

External links
A Nation is Built at Australian Screen Online
A Nation is Built at Oz Movies

1938 films
Australian documentary films
Australian black-and-white films
1938 documentary films
1930s Australian films
1930s English-language films
Cinesound Productions films